Shaoshan Liu is a US-based computer scientist, who is also the founder, chairman and CEO of PerceptIn. Presently, he is a senior member of IEEE, a member of ACM and a member of the editorial board of IT Professional. Additionally, he is the vice chair of IEEE Computer Society's Special Technical Community on Autonomous Driving Technologies.

Liu holds a Ph.D. degree in computer engineering from University of California, Irvine. His research focuses on deep learning infrastructure, computer architecture, autonomous driving and robotics. He secured numerous patents on robotics and autonomous driving.

Education and career 
Shaoshan Liu took undergraduate and graduate courses at the UCI, where he obtained a Ph.D. in 2010. He earned a M.P.A. from Harvard University.

Prior to his entrepreneur venture, he worked at LinkedIn, Broadcom and Microsoft. In 2016, Liu established PerceptIn, a California-based visual intelligence technology company.

Selected published books

References

Living people
Harvard University alumni
University of California, Irvine alumni
Year of birth missing (living people)
Computer engineers